Scrobipalpa acuminatella is a moth of the family Gelechiidae. It is found in most of Europe, as well as Turkey, southern Siberia, Central Asia (Afghanistan, northern Iran, western Kazakhstan) and China (Anhui). It was recently reported from Canada, with records from Ontario and Québec.

Terminal joint of palpi shorter than second. Forewings pointed, especially in female rather dark fuscous, paler-sprinkled, often ochreous- mixed in disc, sometimes with a few blackish scales posteriorly; stigmata darker, indistinct, first discal beyond plical; traces of pale fascia at 3/4 faintly perceptible. Hindwings over 1, light grey, sometimes darker posteriorly. The larva is grey-greenish; dots black; head brown; 2 pale brown, with two blackish spots.

The moths are on wing from April to August depending on the location.

The larvae feed on Carduus and Cirsium species, but also Cotton thistle, Artemisia species and Serratula tinctoria.

References

External links
 Lepidoptera of Belgium
 Microlepidoptera.nl 
 Plant Parasites of Europe

Scrobipalpa
Moths described in 1850
Moths of Asia
Moths of Europe
Taxa named by John Sircom